Another Country is a 1984 British romantic historical drama written by Julian Mitchell, adapted from his play of the same name. Directed by Marek Kanievska, the film stars Rupert Everett and Colin Firth in his feature film debut.

Another Country is loosely based on the life of the spy and double agent Guy Burgess, Guy Bennett in the film. It explores his homosexuality and exposure to Marxism, while examining the hypocrisy and snobbery of the English public school system.

Plot summary
The setting is a public school, modelled on Eton and Winchester, in the 1930s. Guy Bennett (Rupert Everett) and Tommy Judd (Colin Firth) are pupils and, because they are both outsiders in their own ways, friends (Bennett is gay while Judd is a Marxist).

One day, a teacher walks in on Martineau (Philip Dupuy) and a boy from another house engaged in mutual masturbation. Martineau subsequently hangs himself, as teachers and the senior pupils try their hardest to keep the scandal away from parents and the outside world. The gay scandal, however, gives the army-obsessed house Captain Fowler (Tristan Oliver) a welcome reason to scheme against Bennett. Fowler dislikes him and Judd and wants to stop Bennett from becoming a "God" – a school title for the two top prefects. Fowler is able to intercept a love note from Bennett to James Harcourt (Cary Elwes). Bennett agrees to be punished with a caning so as not to compromise Harcourt; whereas on earlier occasions, he had avoided punishment by blackmailing the other "Lords" with the threat that he would reveal their own experiences with him.

Meanwhile, Judd is reluctant to become a prefect, since he feels that he cannot endorse a "system of oppression" such as this. He makes a memorable, bitter speech about how the boys oppressed by the system grow up to be the fathers who maintain it. Eventually, however, he agrees to become a prefect in order to prevent the hateful Fowler from becoming Head of House. This never comes about because Donald Devenish (Rupert Wainwright) agrees to stay at school and become a prefect if he is nominated to become a God instead of Bennett.

Devastated at the loss of his cherished dream of becoming a God, Bennett comes to realise that the British class system strongly relies on outward appearance and that to be openly gay is a severe hindrance to his intended career as a diplomat.

The film's epilogue reports that he defected to Russia later in his life, after having been a spy for the Soviet Union. Judd died fighting in the Spanish Civil War.

Cast
 Rupert Everett as Guy Bennett
 Colin Firth as Tommy Judd
 Cary Elwes as James Harcourt
 Michael Jenn as Barclay
 Robert Addie as Delahay
 Rupert Wainwright as Donald Devenish
 Tristan Oliver as Fowler
 Piers Flint-Shipman, credited as Frederick Alexander, as Jim Menzies
 Adrian Ross Magenty as Wharton
 Geoffrey Bateman as Yevgeni
 Philip Dupuy as Martineau
 Guy Henry as Head Boy
 Jeffry Wickham as Arthur
 John Line as Best Man
 Gideon Boulting as Trafford
 Nicholas Rowe as Spungin
 Anna Massey as Imogen Bennett
 Betsy Brantley as Julie Schofield
 Jim Tavaré (uncredited) as a featured extra Student and Colin Firth's stand-in

Charles Spencer, 9th Earl Spencer, the younger brother of Diana, Princess of Wales, is an extra (with no dialogue) in three scenes.

Title
The title refers not only to Soviet Russia, which is the "other country" Bennett turns to in the end, but it can be seen to take on a number of different meanings and connotations. It could be a reference to the first line of the second (or third, depending on the version) stanza of the hymn "I Vow to Thee, My Country", which is sung in both the play and film, as well as referring to the fact that English public school life in the 1930s was indeed very much like "another country". In the hymn, the other country referred to is Heaven (or the Kingdom of Heaven). Near the end of the film communism is associated with heaven:

 Wouldn't it be wonderful if communism were true? What, heaven on earth?
 Earth on earth. The just earth.

Another Country is also the title of a 1962 novel by James Baldwin, which includes gay and bisexual characters. The Go-Between is a novel by L. P. Hartley, published in London in 1953 and beginning with the famous line: "The past is a foreign country: they do things differently there." The lead is often misquoted using the expression 'another country'.

The most direct reference is to several well-known lines from English literature, originating from Christopher Marlowe's play The Jew of Malta.
 Thou hast committed–
 Fornication– but that was in another country; / And besides, the wench is dead.

Here "the wench" may refer to Martineau. Most of the students are more interested in covering up a potential scandal than worrying about the actual death. If so, the "adultery" may refer to what is done to Martineau and perhaps all students by the school, rather than his actual sexual liaisons.

Production
Eton College declined to serve as a location for the film. With an additional fountain brought in, the Old Schools Quadrangle at Oxford University became an important location, along other localities such as the Bodleian Library, Brasenose College, Brasenose Lane, and Broad Street. Many interiors were shot at Althorp, seat of the Spencer family. Other scenes were filmed at Apethorpe Hall.

Rupert Everett, who had played the role of Bennett in the play's first run, was cast in that role for the film.

Twenty years later, Everett played the lead in another Marek Kanievska film, A Different Loyalty (2004), playing a spy based on Kim Philby, a close associate of spy Guy Burgess, whom the Bennett character is based on.

Goldcrest Films provided £735,000 of the budget. The balance was made up of £500,000 from the National Film Finance Corporation, deferred fees and the proceeds of a tax leasing deal with Eastern Counties Newspapers. Jake Eberts of Goldcrest says Alan Marshall's producing ensured the film came in on time and on budget while not losing any production value.

Reception
Goldcrest Films invested £735,000 and received £858,000 in return, making them a profit of £123,000.

Awards
The film was entered into the 1984 Cannes Film Festival where it won the award for Best Artistic Contribution.

It was nominated for three BAFTA Awards in film: Editing (1984) Gerry Hambling, Most Outstanding Newcomer to Film (1984) Rupert Everett, and Adapted Screenplay (1984) Julian Mitchell

See also

List of lesbian, gay, bisexual, or transgender-related films by storyline

References

Further reading

External links 
 
 
 
 

1984 films
British romantic drama films
British LGBT-related films
1984 romantic drama films
1980s English-language films
British films based on plays
Films directed by Marek Kanievska
Films set in Oxford
Films set in schools
Films shot in Oxfordshire
Goldcrest Films films
Films set in the 1930s
LGBT-related romantic drama films
1984 LGBT-related films
Films set in boarding schools
Gay-related films
1984 directorial debut films
1980s British films